Carl Osbourne (born December 16, 1992) is a professional footballer from Antigua and Barbuda who plays for the Antigua and Barbuda national team.

He debuted on 23 March 2019, scoring his first goal against Curaçao with a 2-1 victory, securing them in League B of the CONCACAF Nations League.

International career

International goals
Scores and results list Antigua and Barbuda's goal tally first.

References

External links
 
 

Living people
1992 births
Antigua and Barbuda footballers
Antigua and Barbuda international footballers
Association football forwards